John Patrick Sibbald (12 September 1890 – September 1956) was an English professional footballer who played as a forward in the Football League for Blackpool, Southport and Walsall.

Career statistics

References

English footballers
Brentford F.C. players
English Football League players
Southern Football League players
Blackpool F.C. players
West Stanley F.C. players
Sportspeople from Wallsend
Footballers from Tyne and Wear
1890 births
Southport F.C. players
Walsall F.C. players
1956 deaths
Association football inside forwards

Wallsend F.C. players